Likou is a township-level division situated in Qimen County, Huangshan City, Anhui, China.

History
On the evening of December 6th, 2011, Mr. Jiang, Head of the Forest Section of the Qimen County Police Office, hit a four-year-old boy (Jiajia, son of Wang Ronghua 汪荣华) with his car while driving through Shendu Village. The boy died at the scene and the boy's grandfather committed suicide by ingesting pesticide. Mr. Jiang was suspended from office.

Administrative Divisions
Thirteen villages:
 Shiqi, Wuling, Guanghui, Xu, Xitang, Zhengchong, Shendu, Xiangdong, Lixi, Penglong, Huansha, Fuling, Yechen

Former villages:
 Fanjia, Ye, Chentian

See also
List of township-level divisions of Anhui

References

Township-level divisions of Anhui